Joshua Trevor Stander (born 1 January 1994) is a South African professional rugby union player for the  in Super Rugby and  in the Currie Cup and in the Rugby Challenge. His regular position is fly-half.

Career

Youth

At primary school level, he was selected for the Border side that played at the 2007 Under-13 Craven Week competition. At high school level, he played for Queen's College and represented Border at the Under-16 Grant Khomo Week in 2010 and the Under-18 Craven Week in 2011. He was also eligible to play at the 2012 Craven Week, but was not picked as he had agreed to join the Pretoria-based  and fell foul of a newly-adopted Border Rugby Football Union policy of not picking players for their Craven Week squad that already signed contracts with other unions.

Stander made just one appearance for the  side in the 2013 Under-19 Provincial Championship, playing off the bench and slotting a conversion in a 56-7 win against former side  in East London.

Stander also played for the  side in the 2014 Under-21 Provincial Championship. His game against the  turned out to be a memorable one as he scored two tries and kicked twelve conversions for a personal points haul of 34 points as the Blue Bulls recorded a 143–0 win.

Blue Bulls

His first class career started in the 2014 Vodacom Cup.

He did not make an appearance in that match, but was promoted to the starting line-up the following week for their match against  after Tony Jantjies and Jacques-Louis Potgieter were ruled out due to injury and illness.

External links
 Blue Bulls player profile
 itsrugby.co.uk Player profile

References

South African rugby union players
Living people
1994 births
People from Cradock, Eastern Cape
Rugby union fly-halves
Blue Bulls players
Stormers players
Western Province (rugby union) players
Tokyo Sungoliath players
Rugby union players from the Eastern Cape
Kamaishi Seawaves players